Marina Lebedeva (born in Aqkol on ) is a Kazakh biathlete.

Lebedeva competed in the 2010 Winter Olympics for Kazakhstan. Her best performance was 14th as part of the Kazakh relay team. Her best individual finish was 58th, in the sprint She also placed 71st in the individual, and did not finish the pursuit.

As of February 2013, her best performance at the Biathlon World Championships is 11th, as part of the 2011 Kazakh mixed relay team. Her best individual performance is 36th, in the 2011 sprint.

As of February 2013, Lebedeva's best Biathlon World Cup result is 6th, in the individual race at Pokljuka in 2010/11. Her best overall finish in the Biathlon World Cup is 39th, in 2005/06.

References 

1985 births
Biathletes at the 2010 Winter Olympics
Biathletes at the 2014 Winter Olympics
Kazakhstani female biathletes
Living people
Olympic biathletes of Kazakhstan
People from Akmola Region
Asian Games medalists in biathlon
Biathletes at the 2011 Asian Winter Games
Asian Games gold medalists for Kazakhstan
Asian Games bronze medalists for Kazakhstan
Medalists at the 2011 Asian Winter Games